This article covers the 2009 football season in Chile.

National tournaments

Primera División

Apertura Champion: Universidad de Chile (13th title)
Topscorer: Esteban Paredes (17 goals)
Clausura  Champion: Colo-Colo (29th title)
Topscorer: Diego Rivarola (13 goals)
Relegated: Curicó Unido, Rangers, Municipal Iquique
Source: RSSSF

Copa Chile

Winner: Unión San Felipe (1st title)
Source: RSSSF

National team results

Friendly matches

2010 World Cup qualifiers

References

External links
 Chile: Fixtures and Results

 
2009